John Richard Duncan (October 5, 1938 – August 14, 2006) was an American country music singer-songwriter, best known for a string of hits in the mid- to late 1970s. In his career, he released 14 studio albums, including thirteen on Columbia Records. These albums produced more than 30 chart singles, with three of those reaching number one: "Thinkin' of a Rendezvous", "It Couldn't Have Been Any Better", and "She Can Put Her Shoes Under my Bed (Anytime)" from 1976, 1977, and 1978, respectively. Seven more of his singles were top-10 hits.

Biography
Duncan was born in Dublin, Texas, United States. Before he went to Nashville, Duncan attended Texas Christian University in Fort Worth, Texas. He then spent a few years in Clovis, New Mexico.

Early life and influences
Duncan's early life was steeped in West Texas music. He picked this up naturally as a boy listening to his mother play rhythm guitar in his uncle's country band. Later, he began sharpening his vocal skills, influenced by his early idols Eddy Arnold, Perry Como, Jim Reeves, and Frank Sinatra. He was born into a musical family. He was proud of his talented cousins, including Eddie Seals, Jimmy Seals of Seals & Crofts, and country singer Dan Seals. "He knew when he was 12 years old that playing music and singing songs was going to be his life", said his wife, Connie Duncan.

"He grew up here in a small country town and loved music", Jim Harrell said. "His mother played herself and a lot of his cousins played with him." (Jim Harrell, owner and funeral director of Harrell Funeral Home in Dublin, which handled arrangements for his funeral)

After playing and singing with his musically gifted family for a few years, he auditioned demos in April 1959 for Norman Petty in Clovis. Petty recognized his talent as a gifted songwriter, and Duncan was signed to Leader Records, a subsidiary of the Kapp Records label. After three US singles and one UK release between 1959 and 1962 saw little action, Duncan grew tired of the intent to market him as a pop vocalist, and he decided to pursue the country genre and moved to Nashville.

Duncan wrote many songs recorded by artists such as Charley Pride, Marty Robbins, Chet Atkins, Conway Twitty, and Jim Ed Brown.

Career
In Franklin, Tennessee, Duncan worked as a DJ and performed on local morning TV shows. He began to record for Columbia Records in the late 1960s. Between 1967 and 1973, Duncan's recordings never reached the top 20 until "Sweet Country Woman" entered at number six.

In the 1970s, Duncan performed duets with Janie Fricke, many of which were successful. Their songs "Stranger" and "Thinking of a Rendezvous" (both 1976), "It Couldn't Have Been Any Better" (1977), and "Come A Little Bit Closer" (1978, a remake of the song first made popular by Jay and the Americans) were the most successful. "Thinking of a Rendezvous" and "It Couldn't Have Been Any Better" both went to No. 1number one on the Billboard Hot Country Singles chart, as did Duncan's solo 1978 single "She Can Put Her Shoes Under My Bed Anytime".

Duncan's string of top-10 hits continued into 1979 – most notably a cover of Johnny Rivers' "Swayin' to the Music" (released by Duncan as "Slow Dancing") and "The Lady in the Blue Mercedes" – and he even enjoyed another top-20 hit with Fricke in 1980 with a duet version of Michael Jackson's "She's Out of My Life". His star power faded in the early 1980s with changing musical tastes, although his biggest songs were popular on country radio through the late 1980s and early 1990s.

Personal life and death
Duncan died of a heart attack on August 14, 2006, at the age of 67. Duncan has three daughters: Angela, Lezlie and Lori with his first wife, Betty Deisher, and his son John “Ike” Duncan with wife Connie Duncan, who survived him.

Discography

Studio albums

Compilation albums

Singles

A"A Song in the Night" also peaked at No. 5 on Bubbling Under Hot 100 Singles.

References

External links
Johnny Duncan Music

1938 births
2006 deaths
American country singer-songwriters
American male singer-songwriters
Columbia Records artists
People from Dublin, Texas
Texas Christian University alumni
20th-century American singers
Singer-songwriters from Texas
Country musicians from Texas
20th-century American male singers